Ali Noorzad (born 21 November 1985) is an Afghan basketball player. He played college basketball for the Rutgers–Camden Scarlet Raptors during the 2010–11 season.

He represented Afghanistan's national basketball team at the 2010 Asian Games in Guangzhou, China, where he played most minutes for his team.

References

External links
 Asia-basket.com Profile

1985 births
Living people
Afghan men's basketball players
Cherry Hill High School East alumni
Point guards
Shooting guards
Rutgers–Camden Scarlet Raptors men's basketball players
Place of birth missing (living people)
South Asian Games gold medalists for Afghanistan
South Asian Games medalists in basketball